David Charles Sandiford (born 24 December 1970) is an English barrister and former first-class cricketer.

Sandiford was born at Bolton in December 1970, where he was educated at Bolton School before going up to St Edmund Hall, Oxford. While studying at Oxford, he played first-class cricket for Oxford University, making his debut against Hampshire in 1991. Sandford played first-class cricket for Oxford until 1992, making ten appearances. Playing as a wicket-keeper, he scored a total of 210 runs in his ten appearances, at an average of 21.00 and a high score of 83, while behind the stumps he took 11 catches and made a single stumping. 

A member of Gray's Inn, he was called to the bar in 1995.

References

External links

1970 births
Living people
People from Bolton
People educated at Bolton School
Alumni of St Edmund Hall, Oxford
English cricketers
Oxford University cricketers
Members of Gray's Inn
English barristers